St. Paul's Cemetery may refer to:
 Old Saint Paul's Cemetery, Baltimore, Maryland
 St. Paul's Lutheran Church, Parsonage and Cemetery, Dutchess County, New York
 St. Paul's German Presbyterian Church and Cemetery, Elmont, New York
 St. Paul's Church and Cemetery (Paris Hill, New York)
 St. Paul's Church and Cemetery (Newton, North Carolina)
 St. Paul's Episcopal Church and Cemetery, Wilkesboro, North Carolina
 St. Paul's Union Church and Cemetery,  Schuylkill County, Pennsylvania
 St. Paul's Cemetery (Alexandria, Virginia)

See also
St. Paul's Church (disambiguation)